The Ninety-Seventh Wisconsin Legislature was convened on
January 3, 2005 and ended on January 3, 2007. The final adjournment for
legislative activity had been scheduled for December,
2006.

Party summary

Officers

Senate
President of the Senate: Sen. Alan Lasee
President pro tempore: Sen. David Zien
Chief Clerk: Hon. Robert J. Marchant
Sergeant at arms: Hon. Edward Blazel

Assembly
Speaker of the Assembly: Rep. John Gard
Speaker pro tempore: Rep. Stephen Freese
Chief clerk: Hon. Patrick E. Fuller
Sergeant at arms: Hon. Richard A. Skindrud

Members

Senate
Members of the Wisconsin Senate for the Ninety-ninth Wisconsin Legislature (33):

Assembly
Members of the Assembly for the Ninety-seventh Wisconsin Legislature (99):

References

External links

Wisconsin legislative sessions
2000s in Wisconsin